LeRoy Hagen Anderson (February 2, 1906 – September 25, 1991) was a U.S. Representative from Montana.

Biography
Born in Ellendale, North Dakota, Anderson, the grandson of Norwegian immigrants, moved with his parents to Conrad, Montana, in 1909. He graduated with a B.S. degree from Montana State College in 1927, and went on to do postgraduate work in mathematics and physical chemistry in 1935–1938 at California Institute of Technology in Pasadena, California. He later worked as a wheat and cattle rancher. During the Second World War he served as commander of an armored task force in the European Theater of Operations in combat from Normandy to the Elbe River. He was separated from the service as a lieutenant colonel in 1945. For his service, he received the Silver Star and Croix de Guerre Medal with Palm. He served as a Major general in Army Reserve, commanding the 96th Infantry Division Reserve from 1948 through 1962.

He served as a member of the Montana House of Representatives in 1947 and 1948 and the Montana State Senate from 1949 through 1956, serving as Democratic floor leader 1954–1956. He was an unsuccessful candidate for election in 1954 to the Eighty-fourth Congress.

Anderson was elected as a Democrat to the Eighty-fifth and Eighty-sixth Congresses (January 3, 1957 – January 3, 1961).
He was not a candidate for renomination in 1960 but was unsuccessful for the Democratic nomination for United States Senator.
He resumed engineering pursuits.
He served as member of the Montana State senate from 1966 to 1970.
He was a resident of Conrad, Montana, until his death there on September 25, 1991.

References

 Retrieved on 2008-02-18

1906 births
1991 deaths
American people of Norwegian descent
Democratic Party members of the Montana House of Representatives
Democratic Party Montana state senators
Montana State University alumni
California Institute of Technology alumni
Recipients of the Silver Star
Recipients of the Croix de Guerre 1939–1945 (France)
United States Army generals
People from Conrad, Montana
People from Ellendale, North Dakota
Democratic Party members of the United States House of Representatives from Montana
20th-century American politicians
United States Army personnel of World War II
United States Army reservists